Anthony Perenise (born 18 October 1982 in Porirua, Wellington Region, New Zealand) is a rugby union player who plays at prop for Rouen in the French Pro D2 and internationally for Samoa.

Perenise joined Bristol in 2013 on a three-year contract from Bath. After Bristol's relegation, Perenise rejoined Bath ahead of the 2017/18 season.

On 23 July 2019, Perenise left Bath to sign for French club named Rouen in the Pro D2 from the 2019–20 season.

References

External links
 Anthony Perenise – Hurricanes Profile
 Anthony Perenise – Bath Rugby Profile

1982 births
Living people
New Zealand rugby union players
Samoa international rugby union players
Bath Rugby players
Bristol Bears players
Hurricanes (rugby union) players
Highlanders (rugby union) players
Hawke's Bay rugby union players
Wellington rugby union players
Rugby union props
Rugby union players from Wellington City
New Zealand sportspeople of Samoan descent
Expatriate rugby union players in England
People educated at Bishop Viard College
New Zealand expatriate sportspeople in England